Jorge Salinas (born July 27, 1968) is a Mexican television and film actor, best known for his leading roles in telenovelas.

Career
Salinas then enrolled at Centro de Educación Artística (CEA) in 1990 and after finishing his studies, he received his first opportunity in the telenovela Valeria y Maximiliano. He also appeared in the telenovelas El abuelo y yo (1991), Mágica juventud (1992), Dos mujeres, un camino (1993) and María Isabel (1997).

In 1999, Salinas starred in the main cast of Sexo, pudor y lágrimas and in 2000, he appeared in the film Amores perros.

Salinas played leading roles in the telenovelas Tres mujeres (1999), Mi Destino Eres Tú (2000), Las Vías del Amor (2002), Mariana de la Noche (2003) and La esposa virgen (2005).

In 2008, Salinas was one of the leading actors of the successful telenovela Fuego en la sangre, where he shared credits with Adela Noriega and Eduardo Yáñez. 
In 2011, he starred in La que no podia amar as the lead Rogelio Montero Baez.

In 2012, producer Salvador Mejía Alexandre cast Salinas in the starring role for Qué bonito amor, a new version of the Colombian telenovela La Hija del Mariachi.

In 2014, Salinas starred in the telenovela Mi corazon es tuyo (My Heart is Yours). This won the best novela of the year. He played the protagonist,(Fernando Lascurian Borbolla) alongside Silvia Navarro (Ana Leal) and the villain Mayrin Villanueva.

In 2017, Salinas starred with César Évora in the stage play Variaciones Enigmáticas, written by Eric-Emmanuel Schmitt.

In 2019, Salinas starred in "Un Poquito Tuyo" as Antonio Solano with Majorie de Sousa as Juelita Vargas.

In 2020, Salinas starred in "Te Doy La Vida" as Ernesto Rioja Armida with Eva Cedeno as Elena Villasenor and Jose Ron as Pedro Garrido.

Personal life 
Salinas had a brief relationship with actress Adriana Cataño, and the couple have one daughter, Gabriella (born September 1995). He married Fátima Boggio in 1996; they had twin sons together, Santiago and Jorge Emilio (born 2005), before their divorce in 2009. 

Salinas has a daughter named Valentina Salinas Noli, from a relationship with Actress Andrea Noli born on September 9, 2006.

On October 15, 2011, Salinas married actress Elizabeth Álvarez, whom he met while filming the telenovela "La Fea Más Bella" and later starred with in "Fuego En La Sangre". The couple had twins, daughter Máxima and son León, on December 2, 2015.

Filmography

Films

Television

Awards and nominations

References

External links
 Jorge Salinas' Oficial Mini-site
 Biography at esmas.com
 

Mexican male film actors
1968 births
Living people
Mexican male telenovela actors
Male actors from Mexico City